Leucoptera thessalica is a moth in the family Lyonetiidae. It is found in Greece.

They probably mine the leaves of their host plant.

External links
Fauna Europaea

Leucoptera (moth)
Moths of Europe